Loveland Ski Area is a ski area in the western United States, located near the town of Georgetown, Colorado. Located at the eastern portal of the Eisenhower Tunnel, Loveland is within the Arapahoe National Forest. It is one of the closest ski areas to the Denver metropolitan area and Front Range corridor, making it popular with locals.

The company was long operated by Chet Upham of Mineral Wells, Texas, until his death in 2008, then by his widow Virginia Lee Upham until her death in 2015. The Upham family continues to own the ski area.

Description
The Loveland Ski Area is the combination of two separate areas—Loveland Basin and Loveland Valley. The two areas, formerly connected by a double chairlift, are now served by bus. The ski area takes its name from adjacent Loveland Pass, which separates it from the nearby Arapahoe Basin ski area, on the west side of the Divide via U.S. Route 6.

The ski area is situated on the east side of the Eisenhower Tunnel, through which I-70 crosses the Continental Divide. Because of its lofty elevation, Loveland is typically one of the first ski areas to open; the earliest opening record on October 7, 2009. It also has the most "first" victories (five and one tie) in recent years.
It is generally regarded as the closest major ski area open to the Denver market. Due to its lack of on-site lodging, Loveland often has shorter lift lines and less-expensive lift tickets, particularly midweek.

Loveland Basin
Loveland Basin is the windiest of the two areas that compose Loveland Ski Area.

It contains most of the runs and lifts in the ski area, including all of the "Most Difficult" and "Expert" terrain. Eight of the ten chairlifts are located in the Basin. The bottom of the mountain contains the Basin Lodge. The basin lodge is a building that contains the Loveland Grill, as well as a Deli, and two bars. There are also many cabins on the mountain, which contain both warming huts and some are food service. All have propane grills and heated insides. The historic E-Tow Cabin is one of these, which was the site of the original E-Tow Lift. Most can be rented out.

Loveland Valley Ski Area
Loveland Valley is geared toward beginners. It has two chair lifts, Chair 3, which serves its intermediate and racing runs, and Chair 7, which exclusively serves its beginner slopes, All Smiles and Take Off. Generally, its slopes are gentler which suits itself well to be the home of Loveland’s Ski and Ride School.

Loveland Valley has a lodge building that consists of a cafeteria, bar, the Ski and Ride School office, a ticket office, a rental shop, lockers, hygiene services and a retail area.

Loveland Race Club is also located within the Valley. The Club practices and races at the upper end of the Valley’s Switchback Trail. Practices are held every afternoon and races are held on the weekend. The Club also has a lodge just below the base of Chair 3.

There is a big race that happens at Loveland Valley every year called the Loveland Derby that is put on by the Loveland Race Club.

Ski patrol
Loveland has a combination volunteer and paid patrol that services the mountain and leads the way for other volunteer patrols with their extensive camaraderie. It is one of the few patrols in the Rocky Mountain Division that has an active young adult program, who share the same responsibilities as their adult compatriots.

History
Loveland was first opened as a ski area in 1936 by J.C. Blickensderfer, who installed a portable tow rope in what is now Loveland Basin. The following year, operations were taken over by Al Bennett who used a modified Model T to power the tow. In 1941 the area was named Loveland Ski Tow Inc. and through the 1940s the area grew to boast 4 tows.

Many changes occurred during the 1950s and 1960s which made the area much more accessible. In 1955, Loveland Ski Tow Inc. was purchased by stockholders and Pete Seibert, the future co-founder of the Vail Ski Resort, was hired as General Manager. 
Loveland's first chairlift, Chair 1, opened in 1955. Chair 2 was added in 1957, as was the Mambo Café, which was situated near the base of what is now Chair 4.  Chairs 3 and 4 were also constructed during the 1960s. 
Loveland saw the construction of the Eisenhower Tunnel beginning in 1968, with tunnel openings in 1973 and 1979. The owner Upham and Loveland general manager Otto Werlin conceived the idea of artificial snow from observing the pumps and compressors being used to dig the tunnel.

The 1980s and 1990s brought about several upgrades to existing equipment. In 1984, snowmaking capabilities were installed. In 1985, Chair 2 was upgraded to a triple chairlift. The late 1980s also saw the construction of expanded lodge facilities at the Valley area. Lift 8, a fixed grip quad, was installed to access intermediate and advanced terrain in 1990. In 1995, the Basin’s lodge was remodeled and expanded. Lift #3 was replaced in 1996 with a fixed grip quad. 1998 saw the installation of another fixed grip quad, Lift #9, which provided access to
"The Ridge". Prior to Breckenridge Ski Resort's construction of the Imperial Express SuperChair in 2005, Lift 9 was the highest offloading chairlift in North America.

In 2011, the aging Lift 4 was replaced with a triple chairlift. The E Tow Cabin was removed.

For 2015, Lift 2 was split in half, and it was shortened to end at its midstation. The upper section of the lift was replaced with a new fixed grip triple called Ptarmigan, running in the alignment of the former platter.

In 2018, Lift 1 (a fixed-grip triple installed in 1981) was replaced by a Leitner-Poma high speed quad, named "Chet's Dream".

Proposed Olympic venue
When the International Olympic Committee awarded the 1976 Winter Olympics to Denver in May 1970, the local organizers' proposal included the development of Mount Sniktau as the primary venue for alpine ski racing for downhill and giant slalom, with slalom at Loveland Ski Area. By early 1972, it was decided to move the alpine events to Vail because the proposals did not meet the Olympic standards. After the Colorado voters, in November, rejected public funding for the Olympics, it was relocated to Innsbruck, Austria.

Plane crash

On a clear Friday afternoon in early October 1970, a chartered airplane carrying half of the Wichita State University football team crashed just northeast of the ski area. A total of forty were on board and only nine survived; the cause was attributed to several pilot errors. First responders were motorists (I-70/US-6) and construction workers at the Eisenhower Tunnel.

References

External links
 
 MySpace.com - Loveland 
 3dSkiMaps.com - Loveland Ski Area - 3-D map
 New #4 Chair Development

Buildings and structures in Clear Creek County, Colorado
Ski areas and resorts in Colorado
Tourist attractions in Clear Creek County, Colorado